Ryūsei, Ryusei or Ryuusei may refer to:

Vehicles 
, a World War II Japanese bomber
, a NASDA reentry demonstrator
, a Japanese transport ship during World War II

Other 
Ryūsei (given name), a masculine Japanese given name
, a Go competition
, a single by Japanese rock band FLOW
Ryusei (song), a CD single by Sandaime J Soul Brothers from Exile Tribe
Ryūsei-ha, a Japanese school of ikebana

See also 
 Longjing (disambiguation), Ryūsei in Japanese